Gita Niketan Awasiya Vidyalaya is a boarding school in Kurukshetra, Haryana, India. It is run by the Vidya Bharati, an educational organisation.

The school was founded on 21 January 1973 by Madhav Sadashiv Rao Golvalkar and is run by  Vidya Bharati all India educational organisation which runs more than 24,000 schools.

Gita Niketan Awasiya Vidyalaya participates in quizzing competitions, and hosted Vidya Bharti's All-India Quiz Competition in 2007.

History
The school was founded on 21 January 1973 by Madhav Sadashiv Rao Golvalkar . It is run by Vidya Bharti, an all India educational organisation which runs more than 24,000 schools.

School organisation

Academics 
Gita Niketan Awasiya Vidyalaya is affiliated with the Central Board of Secondary Education (CBSE) and functions up to the Senior Secondary level of education (Class 12).

House system
The school follows a house system, a system commonly used in public schools. The four houses are named after famous rivers in India: Brahmaputra, Ganga, Ravi, and Yamuna. Each house is represented by a color which matches the first letter of the house.
 Brahmaputra- Blue
 Ganga - Green
 Ravi- Red
 Yamuna- Yellow

See also
Education in India
Literacy in India  
List of institutions of higher education in Haryana

References

External links 
 

Schools in Haryana
Round Square schools
Boarding schools in Haryana
1973 establishments in Haryana
Educational institutions established in 1973